Roe or hard roe, is the fully ripe egg masses of fish and certain marine invertebrates.

Roe or ROE may also refer to:

Places

Australia
 Electoral district of Roe, Western Australia
 Roe Botanical District or Mallee, a biogeographic region in southern Western Australia
 Roe Plains, Western Australia, a coastal plain
 Roe River (Western Australia)

United Kingdom
 Roe Beck, Cumbria, England, also known as the River Roe in its lower reaches
 River Roe, County Londonderry, Northern Ireland

United States
 Roe, Arkansas, a town
 Roe River, Montana
 Roes Spring, a stream in Georgia

People
 Roe (surname)
 Roe (given name)

ROE or RoE
 Return on equity or ROE, the rate of return for ownership interest of common stock owners
 Rules of engagement, the internal rules or directives among military forces
 Royal Observatory, Edinburgh or ROE, Scotland, UK
 Ring of Elysium or RoE, a 2018 battle royale video game developed by Tencent Games
 Rise of the Eldrazi or ROE, a Magic: The Gathering expansion
 Rubies of Eventide or ROE, a defunct massively multiplayer online role-playing game

Military 
 USS Roe (DD-24), a modified Paulding-class destroyer launched in 1909
 USS Roe (DD-418), a Sims-class destroyer launched in 1939

Transport
 Roe (ship), two slave ships
 Roe Highway, a highway in the suburbs of Perth, Western Australia
 Rotherhithe railway station, London, National Rail station code

Other uses
Roe v. Wade, a landmark 1973 United States Supreme Court decision on the issue of abortion
 "Roe", a season 5 episode of Boston Legal
 Charles H. Roe, a British coachbuilding company

See also
 Pseudonyms for parties whose true identity is unknown or must be withheld in a legal matter:
 Jane Roe (pseudonym)
 Richard Roe (pseudonym)
 Roes, a townland in Inver, County Donegal, Ireland
 Rowe (disambiguation)